William Alexander Griffith (August 19, 1866 – May 25, 1940) was an American painter and educator.

Griffith was educated at the St. Louis School of Fine Arts, and became the chair of the Art department at the University of Kansas for twenty-one years, and he co-founded of the art colony in Laguna Beach, California in 1919. He was the president of the Laguna Beach Art Association from 1920 to 1921, and from 1925 to 1927.

References

1866 births
1940 deaths
People from Lawrence, Kansas
People from Laguna Beach, California
Washington University in St. Louis alumni
Académie Julian alumni
University of Kansas faculty
Painters from Kansas
Painters from California
American male painters
19th-century American painters
20th-century American painters